Asbury is an unincorporated community in Chippewa County, in the U.S. state of Minnesota.

History
The community was named for Francis Asbury, a religious leader in the Second Great Awakening.

References

Unincorporated communities in Chippewa County, Minnesota
Unincorporated communities in Minnesota